The phrase Big Ten Conference basketball tournament may refer to:

Big Ten men's basketball tournament
Big Ten women's basketball tournament